Hammersmith Fire Station  is a Grade II listed building at 244 Shepherd's Bush Road, Hammersmith, London W6 7NL.

It was built in 1913 by the architect W. E. Riley.

After being decommissioned as a fire station in the 2000s, it was a pub called "The Old Fire Station", and is now a branch of the restaurant chain, Wagamama. It became their 100th restaurant.

Hammersmith's current fire station (since 2003) is located slightly further to the north in the same street, at 190–192.

References

Grade II listed buildings in the London Borough of Hammersmith and Fulham
Grade II listed government buildings
Fire stations completed in 1913
Fire stations in the United Kingdom
1913 establishments in England
Former pubs in London
Pubs in the London Borough of Hammersmith and Fulham